Trafford Metropolitan Borough Council elections are generally held three years out of every four, with a third of the council being elected each time. Trafford Metropolitan Borough Council, generally known as Trafford Council, is the local authority for the metropolitan borough of Trafford in Greater Manchester, England. Since the last boundary changes in 2004, 63 councillors have been elected from 21 wards. New ward boundaries are being prepared to take effect from the 2023 election.

Political control
Trafford was created under the Local Government Act 1972 as a metropolitan borough, with Greater Manchester County Council providing county-level services. The first election to the council was held in 1973, initially operating as a shadow authority before coming into its powers on 1 April 1974. Greater Manchester County Council was abolished in 1986 and Trafford became a unitary authority. Political control of the council since 1974 has been held by the following parties:

Leadership
The leaders of the council since 2004 have been:

Composition
Following the May 2022 election, the political composition of the council is as follows:

The next election is due in May 2023.

Wards
The council comprises 63 councillors who represent the borough and its residents. Each councillor typically serves for a four-year term, representing an electoral ward.

Council elections
One third of the council is elected each year, followed by one year without election.

1973 Trafford Metropolitan Borough Council election, held Thursday 10 May.
1975 Trafford Metropolitan Borough Council election, held Thursday 1 May.
1976 Trafford Metropolitan Borough Council election, held Thursday 6 May.
1978 Trafford Metropolitan Borough Council election, held Thursday 4 May.
1979 Trafford Metropolitan Borough Council election, held Thursday 3 May.
1980 Trafford Metropolitan Borough Council election, held Thursday 1 May.
1982 Trafford Metropolitan Borough Council election, held Thursday 6 May.
1983 Trafford Metropolitan Borough Council election, held Thursday 5 May.
1984 Trafford Metropolitan Borough Council election, held Thursday 3 May.
1986 Trafford Metropolitan Borough Council election, held Thursday 8 May.
1987 Trafford Metropolitan Borough Council election, held Thursday 7 May.
1988 Trafford Metropolitan Borough Council election, held Thursday 5 May.
1990 Trafford Metropolitan Borough Council election, held Thursday 4 May.
1991 Trafford Metropolitan Borough Council election, held Thursday 2 May.
1992 Trafford Metropolitan Borough Council election, held Thursday 7 May.
1994 Trafford Metropolitan Borough Council election, held Thursday 5 May.
1995 Trafford Metropolitan Borough Council election, held Thursday 4 May.
1996 Trafford Metropolitan Borough Council election, held Thursday 2 May.
1998 Trafford Metropolitan Borough Council election, held Thursday 7 May.
1999 Trafford Metropolitan Borough Council election, held Thursday 6 May.
2000 Trafford Metropolitan Borough Council election, held Thursday 4 May.
2002 Trafford Metropolitan Borough Council election, held Thursday 2 May.
2003 Trafford Metropolitan Borough Council election, held Thursday 1 May.
2004 Trafford Metropolitan Borough Council election, held Thursday 10 June. All seats contested due to boundary changes
2006 Trafford Metropolitan Borough Council election, held Thursday 4 May.
2007 Trafford Metropolitan Borough Council election, held Thursday 3 May.
2008 Trafford Metropolitan Borough Council election, held Thursday 1 May
2010 Trafford Metropolitan Borough Council election, held Thursday 6 May
2011 Trafford Metropolitan Borough Council election, held Thursday 5 May
2012 Trafford Metropolitan Borough Council election, held Thursday 3 May.
2014 Trafford Metropolitan Borough Council election, held Thursday 22 May.
2015 Trafford Metropolitan Borough Council election, held Thursday 7 May.
2016 Trafford Metropolitan Borough Council election, held Thursday 5 May.
2018 Trafford Metropolitan Borough Council election, held Thursday 3 May.
2019 Trafford Metropolitan Borough Council election, held Thursday 2 May.
2021 Trafford Metropolitan Borough Council election, held Thursday 6 May (delayed from May 2020 due to the coronavirus pandemic).
2022 Trafford Metropolitan Borough Council election, held Thursday 5 May.

By-election results

By-elections in the 2010s

By-elections in the 2000s

By-elections in the 1990s

By-elections in the 1980s

By-elections in the 1970s

References

External links
Trafford Metropolitan Borough Council

 
1974 establishments in England
Local government in Trafford
Elections in Trafford
Council elections in Greater Manchester
Metropolitan borough council elections in England